Chelyabinsk Watch Factory "Molnija" (sometimes transliterated Molniya) was a Russian watch and clockmaker based in Chelyabinsk, Chelyabinsk Oblast. Molnija (Молния) is the Russian word for lightning.

History 
The Molnija clock and watch factory opened on November 17, 1947. The company's main customer was then the Soviet Union Department of Defense, providing them with wristwatches, pocket watches and table clocks.

Molnija's main product were mechanical pocket watches with military, religious and historical motifs. The Molnija movement is basically a copy of a Cortébert movement used in Swiss watches from around 1940. About 80% of the work on most of the watches was done by hand. Some Molnija movements were used in oversized men's wristwatches. Early Molnija pocket watch movements (from 1947 to c. 1960) normally had 15 jewels. Later ones (from around 1965 to 1997) normally had 18 jewels. However from around 1997 they started to produce lower quality  watches with fewer jewels.

The company ceased production in October 2007. A few employees continued to sell Molnija watches  assembled from unused stock, and 'new' Molnija pocket watches were still available on the market for some time afterwards.

Modern revival
After the closure of the factory in 2007, a small group of people revived the Molnija brand with new designs.
As of 2021, the factory "Molnija" produces technical watches for aircraft and ships, and is actively developing new markets.

Products

Notes

External links
 

Defunct watchmaking companies
Watch manufacturing companies of the Soviet Union
Watch manufacturing companies of Russia
Companies based in Chelyabinsk
Cultural heritage monuments in Chelyabinsk Oblast